The Firuzabad Tower is a grave historical tower of the Great Seljuq Empire era that is located 17 km south of Bardaskan in Firuzabad village at Shahrabad District on old Torshiz. Archaeological evidence confirms the habitat of Islam until the seventh century AH, which is around the province and shining star of the eighth Imam of Appreciation through Ali ar-Ridha of this was the route. Cylindrical shape with an outward current height of the minarets and 18 meters with decorative elements and architectural style reflects the bricklayer is a mystery. The tower was added as the 91st monument to the list of Iran's national monuments.

Gallery

See also 
 Aliabad Tower
 Seyed Bagher Ab anbar
 Abdolabad Tomb
 Iran National Heritage List

Notes and references 

Buildings and structures in Bardaskan
Towers in Iran
Towers completed in the 14th century
Round towers
National works of Iran
Tourist attractions in Razavi Khorasan Province